Lee Circle is a central traffic circle in New Orleans, Louisiana, which featured a monument to Confederate General Robert E. Lee between 1884 and 2017. The monument was a bronze statue by Alexander Doyle, a prominent American sculptor known for statues of Civil War figures.  Lee Circle is located at the intersection of St. Charles and Howard Avenues. Prior to the erection of the monument, the location was known as Tivoli Circle or Place du Tivoli.  Tivoli Circle was an important, central point in the city, as it linked upriver areas with downriver areas.  It was a common local meeting point and the site remains a popular place to gather for Mardi Gras parades.

Renaming controversies
On July 31, 1877, "Lee Place" within "Tivoli Circle" was authorized by Ordinance A.S. 4064  Although the traffic circle is commonly referred to as "Lee Circle", this ordinance makes clear that the "enclosure" containing the statue is to be known as "Lee Place", while the traffic circle itself continues to be known as "Tivoli Circle". This ordinance contains no reference to the name "Lee Circle".

On June 24, 2015, New Orleans Mayor Mitch Landrieu acknowledged the impact of the June 2015 Charleston church shooting but credited a 2014 conversation with New Orleans jazz ambassador Wynton Marsalis for his decision to call for the removal of the Lee statue and renaming of Lee Circle and other city memorials of Confederate slaveholders.

As part of a sixty-day period for public input, two city commissions called for the removal of four monuments associated with the Confederacy: the Lee statue, statues of Jefferson Davis and P.G.T. Beauregard, and an obelisk commemorating the "Battle of Liberty Place".  Governor Bobby Jindal opposed the removals.

On December 17, 2015, the New Orleans City Council voted to remove the four monuments from public display. Four organizations immediately filed a lawsuit in federal court the day of the decision and the City administration agreed that no removals would take place before a court hearing.

Removal of the Lee statue
On May 18, 2017, the City of New Orleans announced that the Lee statue would be removed at 9 a.m. the following day. This was the last of the four Confederate memorials to be removed by the city. The city also announced that the statue would be replaced with a water feature. 

The removal of the Lee statue was completed on the evening of May 19 at 6 p.m. C.D.T., a departure from the other removals which occurred during early morning hours under the cover of darkness.

On February 23, 2019, a rider was banned for life from a Mardi Gras parade for throwing beads bearing the likeness of the Lee statue, which she had created and sold online as a business venture for profit.  The beads were against a city ordinance that restricts advertising and political messaging, and were known to be non-compliant within Orleans Parish.

See also
 Robert E. Lee Monument (New Orleans, Louisiana)
 List of streets of New Orleans

References

Further reading
 
 
  Published on the occasion of the dedication of the John Hancock Building (now known as K&B Plaza), New Orleans, LA, December 7, 1961.
 
 

Geography of New Orleans
Transportation in New Orleans
Streets in New Orleans
Monuments and memorials to Robert E. Lee